Sienno  is a village in Lipsko County, Masovian Voivodeship, in east-central Poland. It is the seat of the gmina (administrative district) called Gmina Sienno.

The village has a population of 1,000.

History
The History of Sienno dates back to at least the 14th century, in 1375AD was built the first wooden church, at that time it belonged to the parish in Chotcza. 
Between 1431 and 1442 Dobisław z Oleśnicy, the lord of Sienno, was built of a church of brick in the Gothic style and it was consecrated by Cardinal Zbigniew Oleśnicki.

In the 16th century the church was replaced by Sebastian Sienieński as a calvinist church. Catholics reconsecrated the building at the beginning of the 18th century.
It was partially destroyed by fire in 1879 and again during World War I. Rebuilt in the interwar period, it is today an example of Gothic architecture. Five Gothic paintings on Panel with from 1460AD are located in Medieval Art Gallery in the National Museum in Warsaw.

Sienno received city rights in approx. 1430, and has lost them after the January uprising in 1869.
Sienna residents participated in the January uprising and in the resistance during World War II. There was a battle 7 km to the North of the village. This was the place of death of Colonel Dionizy Czachowski.

Sienno had a significant Jewish population which may have begun in the 16th century.  In 1921, Jews numbered 735, about 44 percent of the town's population.  By the German occupation of September 1939, that number had grown to around 800. The Germans forced Sienno's Jews into a ghetto in December 1941 and other Jews of the region were deported into it.  Overcrowding contributed to a typhus epidemic in February 1942.  Without a doctor or hospital, several died.   When the Jewish population was rounded up in October 1942, there were 2000.  All were sent to the Treblinka killing camp where they were gassed.  Other Jews from the region were then briefly brought into the empty ghetto, later also to be gassed at Treblinka.  Some of Sienno's Jews escaped to the forest where they formed, with others, a partisan band.  Without many armaments, they were wiped out by Germans in December 1942.  The number of Holocaust survivors from Sienno is unknown.  The historic wooden synagogue in Sienno was destroyed by the Germans as was the cemetery. A famous Rabbi from Sienno was  Abraham Joshua Heschel, the famous Jewish philosopher, theologian, and writer.

People of Sienno
Sienno was the home town of prominent members of Dębno coat of arms including among others, Bishop of Krakow Cardinal Zbigniew Oleśnicki (later Archbishop of Gniezno), Jakub z Sienna. 
Coat of Arms for Sienno is the coat of arms of the Dębno family, which, inter alia, includes the Oleśnicki's and Sienieński's families.
John from Sienno, founder of Zloczow 1442
Thomas from Sienno, Bishop
James from Sienno, Bishop
Jan Sienieński, voivode of Podolskie Voivodeship,
Jan Sienieński, Castellan of Małogoszcz,
Dobiesław Sienieński, Canon of Gniezno, Dean of Kielce and Radom
Jakub Sienieński – lecturer at the Racovian Academy.
Zbigniew Sienieński, Castellan
Zbigniew Oleśnicki Cardinal
Baltazar Opec, writer
Włodzimierz Sedlak, priest, professor
Abraham Joshua Heschel, the Jewish philosopher and theologian, Rabbi in Sienno
Lucjan Fornalski, landowner, owner of a nearby farm Coins (Narożniki)

Gallery

References

External links
 Jewish Community in Sienno on Virtual Shtetl

Sienno
Holocaust locations in Poland